Li Zhi (born November 13, 1978) is a mainland Chinese music artist who was banned from People's Republic of China in April 2019. According to the China Daily newspaper published in 2015, Li was a music artist who sold out his concert tickets quickly. His 2014 New Year concert I/O sold out all 3,600 tickets in 13 minutes.

Early life and career 
Li was born to a rural family. He became a professional singer in 1995. Before 2018, Li had not signed with any studios. He also restrained from getting himself involved in TV shows and popular media. On October 23, 2018, Taihe Music's Weibo official account announced that Li Zhi will be partnering.

Defender of Artists' Copyright 
Li is known as a defender of artists' copyright. He had filed lawsuits against music platforms Xiami Music and Kuwo Music. In 2017, Li publicly accused the Chinese version of TV show Roast (produced by Tencent) of using his song without permission. In 2018, Li filed lawsuits accusing the Tencent Video-produced show The Coming One violating his copyrights when Li's music was used in the program without his legal approval. Li asked for 3 million yuan in compensation. The court agreed with the copyright infringement. However, the TV show did not apologize for the copyright violation and Li was compensated with an amount below what was expected.

334 Tour 

 "334 Tour" or "334 Plan" was a plan that Li will tour to 334 cities in 12 years and perform his music live from 2017-2029. It was announced February 20, 2019.
Two days later, February 22, 2020, Li Zhi's team officially announced that the Sichuan tour was canceled due to Li Zhi's health situation. the night before his first concert, Li posted on Weibo a photo of his medical wristband saying that he had to cancel his performance due to medical conditions.
18,000 of Li's tour tickets were refunded.

Banned from People's Republic of China 

 Li made references to June 4, 1989 (1989 Tiananmen Square protests) and Tiananmen Square in his songs.
According to The Paper report on April 4, the Sichuan Provincial Department of Culture and Tourism announced that, due to "misbehavior," the government had called off "an unnamed famous singer's planned tour of 23 concerts" in the province.
 Li's artist's tour was cancelled and his social media accounts including Weibo were blocked. His music was removed from all platforms in China. Key words associated with Li are also blocked from the public view.
 A Chinese central government directive ordered all social media websites delete audio or video content relating to five of Li's songs.

References 

1978 births
Living people
Chinese male singers